An étape or etape generally refers to a stage or leg of some sort, often in the context of cycling.  Étape may also refer to:

 Etape du Dales, a cyclosportive event
 L'Étape du Tour, a cyclosportive event